Winkleigh is a rural locality in the local government area of West Tamar in the Launceston region of Tasmania. The 2016 census determined a population of 203 for the state suburb of Winkleigh.

History
The name has been in use for the area since 1870. Winkleigh was gazetted as a locality in 1966.

Geography
The Supply River forms part of the southern boundary, and then flows through to form a small section of the eastern boundary.

Road infrastructure
The C717 route (Winkleigh Road / Flowery Gully Road) enters from the south-east and runs through to the north-west where it exits. Route C718 (Glengarry Road) starts from an intersection with C717 and runs south-west before exiting. Route C716 (Nettlefolds Road) passes through the south-west corner from south to north-west.

References

Localities of West Tamar Council
Towns in Tasmania